Anthemus may refer to:
 Anthemus (city), a district, lake and a city of ancient Macedonia
 Anthemus (wasp), a wasp genus in the subfamily Encyrtinae